Adarsh Nagar railway station is a small railway station in Adarsh Nagar, a residential and commercial neighborhood of the North West Delhi district of Delhi. Its code is ANDI. The station is part of  Delhi Suburban Railway. The station consist of 4 platforms. The platform is not well sheltered. It lacks many facilities including Water and Sanitation. Adarsh Nagar metro station of Yellow Line (Delhi Metro) is a short walk (500-550 metre) from this station.

History

Major trains

 New Delhi–Kurukshetra MEMU
 Jammu Mail
 Kalka Mail
 Delhi Panipat MEMU
 Panipat Ghaziabad MEMU
 Poorabiya Express
 Delhi Kalka Passenger
 Lokmanya Tilak Terminus Amritsar Express

See also

 Adarsh Nagar metro station
 Hazrat Nizamuddin railway station
 New Delhi railway station
 Delhi Junction railway station
 Anand Vihar Terminal railway station
 Delhi Sarai Rohilla railway station
 Delhi Metro

References

External links

Railway stations in North West Delhi district
Delhi railway division